The national parks of Venezuela are protected areas in Venezuela covering a wide range of habitats. In 2007 there were 43 national parks, covering 21.76% of Venezuela's territory.

Statistics
Every Venezuela state has one or more national parks.
 5 national parks - Lara, Amazonas
 4 national parks - Falcón, Mérida, Miranda, Portuguesa, and Táchira.
 3 national parks - Apure, Sucre, and Trujillo.
 2 national parks - Barinas, Bolívar, Carabobo, Distrito Capital, Guárico, Nueva Esparta, Yaracuy, and Zulia.
 1 national park - Anzoátegui, Aragua, Cojedes, Delta Amacuro, Federal Dependencies, Monagas, and Vargas.

18 national parks are over 1000 km2; 15 over 2000 km2; 5 over 5000 km2 and 3 over 10,000 km2. The largest parks, in the Guayana Region, are Parima Tapirapecó National Park (39,000 km2) and Canaima National Park (30,000 km2).

List of national parks

See also
List of national parks
Venezuelan bolívar banknotes

References

External links 

  Instituto Nacional de Parques de Venezuela
  Ministerio del Poder Popular para el Ambiente (Ministry of Environment)
National Parks in Venezuela

 
Venezuela
National parks
National parks